Huang Ching-cheng (1912–1943) was a Taiwanese sculptor. He is counted among the important pioneers of Taiwanese modern art. Lai Hsien-tsung mentions him in one breath with Ju Ming. Huang's sculpture "Study of a Head" (頭像 ‘tóuxiàng’) was the first modern work of art in Taiwan that was declared a part of the island's cultural heritage that is protected by a new law passed in 2009.   It is exhibited in the Kaohsiung Museum of Fine Arts.

Life and career

Early life

Huang was born in Chidong Village (池東村), Xiyu, Hōko Prefecture. This island group had been ceded to Japan by the Chinese government in 1895, like the rest of Taiwan and the Ryu-Kyo Islands, after the First Sino-Japanese War. 
Huang's father owned a pharmacy. Huang, who was raised in a fairly wealthy family, showed an interest in creative activity at an early age. As a boy, he already did small figures made of clay, his elder brother later remembered. He also painted, showing considerable talent which prompted a teacher to encourage him. He dropped out, however, because he dedicated too much time to painting. Therefore, his father had him educated by a private teacher. Because his father wanted him to become a pharmacist, he was sent to a teacher of pharmacology in 1933. Then, he went on to Tokyo, for advanced studies in pharmacology.

Study of art in Tokyo

Huang's desire was to be an artist, however. In 1936, being just 24, Huang was admitted to a Japanese art academy, the Tōkyō Bijutsu Gakkō  (東京美術学校) or Tokyo School of Fine Arts, an art academy that had a good reputation.

When Huang Ching-cheng had departed for Tokyo in 1936, the Second Sino-Japanese war was less than a year away, and the terrible Nanking massacre would happen in November 1937. Chauvinism and militarist sentiments were on the rise. The situation deteriorated with the outbreak of the war against China (1937), and even more so since 1939/40 when the democracy that still had existed up to a point in the late 1930s, was rapidly suspended.

Huang Ching-cheng was violating the dominant ethical code that required filial piety when he was not studying pharmacology. This had consequences. "When his father became aware of this matter, in anger he stopped sending him money for his living expenses and tuition. (…) His brother Huang Qingshun (Ching-Shuan Huang) secretly lent him money, however, and this aid helped him, in part, to complete his studies."

Early work and the influence of Beethoven

The fact that in an expensive city like Tokyo, his brother's  financial support proved insufficient had a good side effect. The young man was compelled to work professionally as an artist while still in art school.  In these highly productive years, he created a considerable number of art works, among them various busts. He also did “full body sculptures” and “seated sculptures.”

Among the works created by Huang Ching-cheng, there were a number of sculptures of Beethoven.    Beethoven was a composer whom the artist greatly admired, as his elder brother confirmed later on.

Huang's interest in music and more specifically, in music from the West, is partly explained by his close relationship with a young pianist, Guixiang Li (李桂香, also:  Kwei-Hsiang Lee). There was more to it, however. Generally speaking, Ludwig van Beethoven and Auguste Rodin stood for modernism at the time, as Y.-L. Hsueh points out. More specifically, under the conditions that existed in Tokyo in the 1930s and 40s, Beethoven and his music stood for cosmopolitanism and a thirst for freedom.

David B. Dennis has pointed out that Beethoven's Ode to Joy  was always interpreted as an "Ode to Freedom" by progressives around the world. "Beethoven's enthusiasm about the French Revolution" is well known. As a Rhinelander, Beethoven had cherished Napoleonic reforms that increased civil liberties and introduced a progressive legal frame of reference, the Napoleonic Code or Code civil.  In Chinese art, literature, and music, criticism of rulers has often been allusive and indirect.  Huang's choice of Beethoven turns out to be in line with this tradition, that “certain cultural heroes often find favor with Chinese artists (…)" because it allows them to take a stand.

Sculpture 

Huang's relationship with Guixiang Li (with whom he shared a passion for Beethoven) is not only revealed indirectly in his Beethoven sculptures. Among the few sculptures of Huang Ching-cheng that are known to have survived World War II and that are exhibited in museums in Taiwan, there is a bust that is titled "My Girlfriend Guei-shiang".  It is part of the collection of the National Taiwan Museum of Fine Arts in Taichung (Guólì Táiwān měishùguǎn/ Táizhōng shì 國立台灣美術館 / 台中市).

MOUVE

In 1937, Huang Ching-cheng teamed up with graduate students at the Tokyo School of Fine Arts to form an artist group that would organize joint exhibitions. According to G. Huang (Huáng Guāngnán 黃光男) and X. Liao (Liào Xīntián 廖新田), these young artists "seceded from the Tai Yang artists’ association" when they formed their own group. Huang and Liao notice the group's "non-mainstream atmosphere."

The anti-mainstream artists soon called their group MOUVE (derived from the French word mouvement). Lai mentions another term by which the artists referred to their group, writing that the name chosen was “Action Art Group (or MOUVE painting group).” “Action Art Group” in Chinese is “xíngdòng měishù jítuán 行動美術集團.” 
According to Chin-hsien Li, it was “Lán Yùn-dēng who recommended the name MOUVE.” Chin-hsien Li points out that at first, the young artists only wrote MOUVE “in Japanese katakana" which emphasized the term's French origin. No Chinese equivalent of the name existed initially. It was a symbolic choice that indicated a turn to the ‘new,’ away from the traditional art embraced by scholars and artists educated during the Qing dynasty and away from the academic Western-style painting practiced by many artists in Tokyo.

The rules that were drawn up by the group stressed research or studies: “1. Our goal is to study from each other frequently. 2. Each year, exhibitions of our studies shall not be fixed in numbers but shall be held when and where suitable (…)”

Hsien-tsung Lai refers to the group as “anti-establishment.” Jen-yi Lai specifically refers to the “Bohemian spirit” revealed in the works of one painter of this group, Jui-Lin Hung (Hóng Ruìlín 洪瑞麟), whom she singles out. But the Bohemian attitude was symptomatic of all members of this group.

Indeed, “MOUVE, at the time, was free. Works were exhibited every year, no works were excluded. Regardless of how often they would take part, regardless of how many works they wanted to show, every member could participate anytime, anywhere in the joint exhibition. This was the so-called MOUVE spirit.” Clearly, “the name was a symbol of avant-garde and of youth.”

On 19 March 1938, the artists who had formed the new group, Wan-chuan Chang (Zhāng Wànchuán 張萬傳), Jui-Lin Hung (Hóng Ruìlín 洪瑞麟), Dewang Chen (Chén Déwàng 陳德旺), Chi-ch’eng Lu (Lǚ Jīzhèng 呂基正), Chunde Chen (Chén Chūndé 陳春德), Huang Ching-cheng, and Liu-jen Teng (Děng Liùrén 等六人) had their first group exhibition. Except for Huang, who was a sculptor and painter, they were all painters.

Painting 

Critics at the time saw Huang Ching-cheng not only as a remarkable sculptor but also as a gifted painter. It has been emphasized that “(d)uring his study in Japan, he (…) specialized in oil painting and held a solo exhibition." Oil on canvas was preferred to ink and to water color techniques by a majority of modernist East Asian artists.  In this, Huang was not different from other Taiwan-born painters who studied in the ‘Western painting’ division of a Japanese art academy.

Chun-hsien Li (李俊賢 Li Jùnxián), art historian at the Kaohsiung Museum of Fine Arts, has noted the distinctive traits and the novelty of Huang's paintings.  He writes,  “If we look at Huang Ching-cheng’s work – "Black Woman" 黑衣女人  (hēi yī nǚrén), we get what may be described as a very direct sense of his use of color, which is very different from that found in the artistic environment of that era.”  Lai also praises Huang when he speaks of  “the mysterious painting, ‘Black Woman’  (...).”

Exhibitions

In 1939, sculptures by Huang Ching-cheng and by another Taiwanese artist, Hsia-yu Chen  陳夏雨, were accepted by a jury and “included in the Imperial Exhibition” (Teiten  Empire Exhibition or Imperial Exhibition, in Japanese: 帝展.) of that year.

A year later, in May 1940, the ‘MOUVE’ group organized “a ‘MOUVE Exhibition’ of  three artists” –   Wan-chuan Chang (張萬傳), ( Yong Xie 謝國庸), and Huang Ching-cheng –  in the Tainan Public Hall (Táinán gōnghuì táng 台南公會堂.), Tainan (台南), South Taiwan.  
In the same year (1940), Huang received an award of the Japanese Sculptors’ Association and it was “recommended” that he should “become a member of the association.”

MOUVE versus Tayang

MOUVE, which Huang Ching-cheng had been founding together with several young Taiwan-born artists in Tokyo,  was now, “at  first glance,  avant-garde, fresh air, so to speak, and  the group’s members were painting in a new way. But it was a small group after all,  no match for the power of the mainstream, especially the ‘Taiyang Art Association.’  Lu Chi-cheng and Chen Chunde soon took  refuge to ‘Taiyang,’ and thus in the following year (1941) there was a pause in the group's activities.”  Another reason for this ‘pause’ may have been Japan's attack on Pearl Harbor and thus, the outbreak of the Pacific War. "At the end of 1940", the group – and that meant: the majority of its members – had already left Japan. “With the advent of the  Pacific war” when “MOUVE was taken to be an English name” by the authorities, the artists were forced  “to change its name.” The name was now changed to “Sculpture and Painting  Association” (zàoxíng měishù xiéhuì 造型美術協會). Because some old members had left, it was a smaller group now.  Under  the new name Sculpture and Painting Association, the group soon  “made a come-back with another exhibition,” however. Those who participated in this group exhibition (in Taiwan rather than Tokyo) were “Yün-teng Lan (Lán Yùndēng藍 運燈), Yen Shui-long (Yán Shuǐlóng顏水龍) and Cho-sao Fan (Fàn Zhuōzào范倬造), in addition to the remaining original members."

A year later, "MOUVE ran (…) out of steam, winding things up in a frenzy like a whirlwind, and it soon disappeared without a trace, after having recorded the flowering and frustration of the opposition faction of Taiwan's art world."

Work in Tainan

Whereas other MOUVE artists like Jui-lin Hung had already returned to Taiwan for good, Huang Ching-cheng remained based in Tokyo. But "every summer, he would return to Taiwan for vacation," as the curator of the Kaohsiung Museum of Fine Arts (KMFA) notes. "Most of the time, he would live in the Tainan house of Kuo-Jong Hsieh (Xiè Guó-yōng 謝國鏞)." During these stays in Tainan, he "made a lot of sculptures for renowned officials of the Tainan district and had the support of local people in Tainan." In Tokyo, Huang did not only complete his studies at the Tokyo School of Fine Arts. Soon recognized for his outstanding talent and accomplishment, he was honored by being invited to participate in several important exhibitions, among them the Bunten Art Exhibition of the Japanese Ministry of Education.

Death

In 1943, Huang Ching-cheng was offered a teaching position at the Beiping Art School in Peking which was then a city occupied by the Japanese army.  Planning to go to Taiwan first, the artist boarded “the passenger liner Takachiho Maru in Kobe, Japan" together with Guixiang Li. The ship was torpedoed by an American submarine as it approached Kīrun. About 1,000 passengers died. Few survived. Huang Ching-cheng was 31 when he died. Huang's premature death was a considerable loss that was felt in the art world of Taiwan.

Taiwanese art after Huang (1940s–1950s)

The fact that Huang Ching-cheng died prematurely may have saved him from suffering the fate of artists and writers who became victims of political repression. Death at age 31 meant that he could not produce a full-fledged, mature oeuvre. Huang's death was a considerable loss that was felt in the art world of Taiwan. But there were more blows to come that would hurt the development of modern art anchored in the socio-culture of the island.

The rebellious Jui-lin Hung, a leading figure of the MOUVE group, who had returned before 1943, became a miner and for several years could not afford oil colors and canvas. The painter Chen Cheng-po was shot by the KMT army in Chiayi in 1947, becoming one of the many victims of the so-called February 28 Incident. Under these conditions, “(t)he development of new art movement(s) was in fact not a smooth one,” as Chiung-jui Hsiao writes.

By the mid-1950, martial law came into effect. Now, Huang Jung-ts’an (Huang Rong-tsan / Huáng Róngcàn 黃榮燦), an artist who did realist woodcuts and who was a friend of the painter Chun-chen Li (Li Zhòngshēng 李仲生), was arrested. He was accused of “espionage in 1951 and (…) executed the next year.” According to Hsiao, this

“event influenced avant-garde artists who were promoting modern art at that time. (…) In 1955, Chao Chung-Hsiang left for Spain because he got the scholarship to study, while Chu Teh-Chun went to France. (…) The school supporting Ho Tieh-hua was on the downside on account of political tensions. His art fairs started to be oppressed. Chuang Shih-ho was admonished and forced to move back to Ping-Tung (i.e., Pingtung City or Píng dōng 屏東) (…) Ho Tieh-hua, on the other hand, (…) left for America in 1959 for good. In the same year, Lin Shen-yang attended the Sao Paulo Exhibition in Brazil as a judge and never returned."

On the other hand, there were those who tried to work. Thus, several of Huang Ching-cheng's colleagues who had participated in the MOUVE artists’ group founded a new group, the Era Art Association, in 1954.

Legacy

Today, many art historians and artists in Taiwan agree on Huang's pioneering role, as a modernist Taiwan-born sculptor. Together with two other sculptors, Tien-shen Pu (Pú Tiānshēng蒲添生) who was born in 1912 like Huang, and Hsia-yu Chen (Chen Xiayu 陳夏雨) who was five years younger, Huang Ching-cheng belongs to the young generation of early Taiwan modernists who followed in the footsteps of Tu-shui Huang and who surpassed him in a way. Insofar, few would disagree with Ya-li Chen that “Huang Tu-shui(黃土水), Huang Ching-cheng, Chen Hsia-yu(陳夏雨) and Pu Tien-sheng(蒲添生) were the most important sculptors in Taiwan” during the Colonial era that came to an end in 1945. Huang's creative role as one of the few Taiwan-born pioneers of early modern sculpture assures him a permanent place in the history of modern art in Taiwan.

Huang in film

In 2005, Huang Ching-cheng's life and work became the theme of a feature film by the Taiwanese film director Huang Yu-shan. The film, released in 2005 and titled The Strait Story, was discussed in two academic publications.

Huang Ching-cheng's life and work is also at the center of a documentary, “The Forgotten: Reflections on Eastern Pond” (2008) by Yu-Shan Huang.

References

Further reading

 Ya-li, Chen, "Taiwanese sculptors during the Japanese Occupation period," in: Taiwan Culture (A publication edited and published by the Ministry of Culture, No.30-1, Beiping E. Rd., Zhongzheng Dist., Taipei City 10049, Taiwan (ROC)), 20 October 2009
 David B(ruce) Dennis, Beethoven in German Politics, 1870–1989. New Haven (Yale University Press) 1996
 David B. Dennis, The Indoctrination of A Muse: Myths of Ludwig van Beethoven and His Music As Evoke in German Political Culture from 1789 to 1989. Los Angeles (University of California, Los Angeles) 1991 (Ph.D. thesis)
 Mary Ann Gillies, Helen Sword and Steven Yao (eds.),  Pacific Rim Modernisms. Toronto (University of Toronto Press) 2009
 Saburo Ienaga, Taiheyo Senso (=The Pacific War). Tokyo (Iwanami Shoten) 1968.
 Saburo Ienaga,  The Pacific War, 1931–1945 : A Critical Perspective on Japan's Role in World War II.   Transl. by Frank Baldwin. New York (Pantheon Books) 1978
Yuko Kikuchi (ed.), Refracted Modernity: Visual Culture and Identity in Colonial Taiwan, Honolulu (University of Hawaii Press) 2007
 Michael Lackner et al. (eds.), New Terms for New Ideas: Western Knowledge and Lexical Change in Late Imperial China. Leiden (Brill) 2001
 Hsien-tsung Lai, “Chāoyuè fúshì de yìshù guānghuá  超越浮世的藝術光華 ”, in:  The Liberty Times (Taipei), 3 November 2005 (print edition). Identical online version:  English translation:  Shen-chon Lai [Hsien-tsung Lai], "A Glow of Art That Transcends the Floating World. (…)", in: Art in Society (ISSN 1618-2154), No.12,   – A book publication by Columbia University Press refers to the article in this way: The Glory of Transcendent Art. See: Lingzhen Wang, Chinese Women's Cinema: Transnational Contexts. NY (Columbia U.P.) 2011, p. 153.
 Jen-yi Lai, Cultural Identity and the Making of Modern Taiwanese Painting During the Colonial Period (1895–1945). Ann Arbor, MI (UMI) 2009. (Ph.D.thesis)
 Mei-xue Ling (staff reporter),  “Xiàndài yìshù zuòpǐn shǒu lì huángqīngchéng diāosù zhǐdìng wéi zhòngyào gǔwù  現代藝術作品首例 黃清埕雕塑指定為重要古物  (Huang Ching-cheng’s Sculpture is the first modern art work designated as an important national heritage )”, in: The Liberty Times, 25 March 2009
 Barbara Mittler, Dangerous Tunes: The Politics of Chinese Music in Hong Kong, Taiwan, and the People's Republic of China. Wiesbaden: 1997
 Chuan-ying Yen, “The Art Movement in the 1930s in Taiwan,” in: John Clark (ed.), Modernity in Asian Art. Sydney (Wild Peony) 1993, pp. 45–58.
 Chuan-ying Yen (顏娟英), “Diantang zhong de meishu: Taiwan zaoqi xiandai meishu yu wenhua qimeng (The Glamour of Modern Art: Early Modern Painting and Cultural Enlightenment in Taiwan)”, in: Bulletin of the Institute of History and Philology, Academia Sinica (Taipei),  vol. 64, no. 2 (1993), pp. 469–610.
 Chuan-ying Yen, “Riju shiqi Taiwan meishushi de yanjiu (Research on Taiwanese art under Japanese rule)”, in: Proceedings of the Conference Minguo yilai guoshi yanjiu de huigu yu zhanwang (A Review and Prospect of Research on National History since the Minguo Period), Department of History, National Taiwan University. Taipei (National Taiwan University) 1992;  vol. 2.
 Chuan-ying Yen, “Riju shiqi Taiwan meishu dashi nianbiao, 1895–1944,” in: Yishu xue (Art Studies), vol.8 (1992), pp. 57–98.
 Chuan-ying Yen, Taiwan jindai meishu dashi nianbiao 1895–1945 (Chronological Table of Modern Taiwanese Art 1895–1945). Taipei (Xiongshi) 1998.
 Chuan-ying Yen, “Taiwan zaoqi xiyang meishu de fazhan” (Development of Taiwan's Early Western Art), in: Yishujia (Artist Magazine), issue 168 (1989), pp. 142–65; issue 169 (1989), pp. 140–61; issue 170 (1990), pp. 178–91.
 Baiyuan Wang, “Taiwan meishu yundong shi (History of Taiwan’s Art Movements)”,  in: Taipei Wenwu, vol.3, no.4 (March 1955), pp. 16–65. – According to Jen-yi Lai,  this was “the first publication to provide a survey of the “new art” pioneered by Japanese-educated Taiwanese.” (Jen-yi Lai,Cultural Identity and the Making of Modern Taiwanese Painting During the Colonial Period (1895–1945). Ann Arbor, MI (UMI) 2009, p. 3)
 Yigang Wang (pseudonym of Wang Baiyuan), “Taizhan, fuzhan [Taiten, Futen]", in: Taipei wenwu, vol.3, no.4 (March 1955), pp. 65–69.   This essay focuses on official art exhibitions of the Japanese colonial period. Taiten was the most important expo that took place in Taiwan. It was organized by the Colonial government.

External links
  Ya-li Chen, “Taiwanese sculptors during the Japanese Occupation period”, in: Taiwan Culture, (Ed. and published by the Ministry of Culture, Taipei), 20 Oct,. 2009. -The article lists Tushui Huang (Huang Tu-shui), Huang Ching-cheng, Hsia-yu Chen (Chen Hsia-yu) and Tien-sheng Pu (Pu Tien-sheng) as the four "most important sculptors" in Colonial Taiwan when that island was ruled by the Japanese government (from 1895 till August 1945).
 Xiāo Cǎihuá 蕭彩華 (author), "黃清呈 Ching Cheng Huang"(article), in: Encyclopedia of Taiwan 
 "Artist's biography 藝 術 家 小 傳 ", in: “Huang Ching-cheng: Study of A Head  黃清埕 ,  頭像.”,  Kaohsiung Museum of Fine Arts (高雄市立美術館館長 ) website. 
 Ministry of Culture, Bureau of Cultural Heritage (ed.), "Huáng Qīngchéng; tóuxiàng黃清埕／頭像 (Statements on) "Ching Cheng Huang, ‘Study of A Head’", 
 G. Huang (Huáng Guāngnán黃光男 ) and X. Liao (Liào Xīntián廖新田 ), "Táiwān měishù zǒng lùn  臺灣美術總論  (General Taiwan Art Theory)", in : Encyclopedia of Taiwan (published by the Ministry of Culture). Also online: 
 N. N., "Huáng Qīngchéng tóuxiàng yìnxiàngpài zuìzǎo táiwān diāosù / Huang Ching-cheng's Study of A Head – the earliest Impressionist sculpture", in: The Merit Times, 25 March 2009. Also online: 
 Yín-huì Wu (reporting from Taipei), "Huáng Tǔ-shuǐ niú diāo xiàndài yìshù shǒu liè guóbǎo / Huáng Tǔ-shuǐ’s Buffalo carved out the first place among the national treasures of modern art", in: China Times, 25 March 2009 (Printed version). – Also online:   – Y.-h. Wu reports: “(…) With the note issued on March 2 by the Council for Cultural Affairs, Cultural Asset Management Preparatory Office, Zhao Mengfu of the National Palace Museum designated Huang Tu-shui’sculpture ‘The South (Water Buffaloes)’ (= Nánguó (shuǐniú qúnxiàng)), which is part of the Taipei Zhongshan Hall Collection, a national treasure, while Huang Ching-Cheng's  ‘Study of A Head’ (Touxiang) was designated an important cultural treasure. [...]".

1912 births
1940s missing person cases
1943 deaths
20th-century Chinese sculptors
Chinese sculptors
Civilians killed in World War II
People from Penghu County
People lost at sea
Taiwanese sculptors